Mussau Island monarch may refer to several species of birds:

 Flores monarch, endemic to Flores 
 Mussau monarch, endemic to the Bismarck Archipelago

Birds by common name